Hideko Mogami (9 December 1902 – 16 October 1966) was a Japanese politician. She was one of the first group of women elected to the House of Representatives in 1946, and remained a member until 1949. She later served in the House of Councillors from 1953 to 1965 and as Deputy Secretary of State for Postal Affairs in 1957–1958.

Biography
Mogami was born in Haruna in 1902. She studied literature at Tokyo Women's University, and married , a reporter for Yorozu Choho. He was elected to parliament in 1930 for the Constitutional Democratic Party. However, after World War II he was banned from politics.

Mogami contested the 1946 general elections (the first in which women could vote) as a Japan Progressive Party candidate, and was elected to the House of Representatives. She was re-elected in 1947 as a Democratic Party candidate, but lost her seat in the 1949 elections. She subsequently stood for election to the House of Councillors in 1950. Although she was unsuccessful, she ran again in 1953 as a Kaishintō candidate and was elected. The party merged into the Democratic Party in 1954 and then the Liberal Democratic Party the following year. From October 1957 to June 1958 she served as Deputy Secretary of State for Postal Affairs. She was re-elected in 1959, serving until 1965. She died the following year. Her nephew , who she adopted in 1963, later also served in the House of Councillors.

References

1902 births
Tokyo Woman's Christian University alumni
20th-century Japanese women politicians
20th-century Japanese politicians
Japan Progressive Party politicians
Members of the House of Representatives (Japan)
Democratic Party (Japan, 1947) politicians
Kaishintō politicians
Members of the House of Councillors (Japan)
Democratic Party (Japan, 1954) politicians
Liberal Democratic Party (Japan) politicians
1966 deaths